St. Ursula's College is a Catholic independent  girls' secondary boarding and day school in Newtown, Toowoomba, Queensland, Australia. The school was established in 1931 by Ursuline nuns. The college is administered by the Catholic Diocese of Toowoomba.

The school is heavily influenced by the teachings of Saint Angela Merici. Many of the school's buildings are named after Italian cities and places such as Brescia and Lake Garda that were part of Merici's life. The college attracts many girls from remote locations throughout Queensland and New South Wales as boarders.

References 

Girls' schools in Queensland
Boarding schools in Queensland
Catholic boarding schools in Australia
Catholic secondary schools in Queensland
Educational institutions established in 1931
Schools in Toowoomba
Roman Catholic Diocese of Toowoomba
Ursuline schools
Alliance of Girls' Schools Australasia

Newtown, Queensland (Toowoomba)
1931 establishments in Australia